Xerodraba is a genus of flowering plants belonging to the family Brassicaceae.

Its native range is Southern Chile to Southern Argentina.

Species:
 Xerodraba colobanthoides Skottsb. 
 Xerodraba glebaria (Speg.) Skottsb.
 Xerodraba lycopodioides (Speg.) Skottsb.
 Xerodraba monantha (Gilg ex Kuntze) Skottsb.
 Xerodraba patagonica (Speg.) Skottsb.

References

Brassicaceae
Brassicaceae genera